Brett Allen Faryniarz (born July 23, 1965) is a former professional American football player who played linebacker for seven seasons in the NFL. In college, he was  a defensive standout for the San Diego State Aztecs, starring on the team's much-maligned "Ocean Breeze" defense. The name derived from a comment by former UCLA quarterback Troy Aikman, who compared the team's pass defense to "just playing catch in the open air." Despite the defense's generally poor caliber, Faryniarz developed a reputation as a "solid quarterback sacker" and laid out Aikman twice during the SDSU UCLA game in the Rose Bowl.  After starting three years for the Aztecs, Faryniarz played for the then-Los Angeles Rams, where he played linebacker. He finished his career on the inaugural Carolina Panthers team in 1995.        

He was born in Carmichael, California.

Acting career
In 2023, Faryniarz provides the voice of a football playing Eagle in the Junga the Dancing Yeti in Yeti Set Go film about sportsmanship and anti-bullying for children. In this scene, professional football players of the Mountain Football League set an example of good sportsmanship. Faryniarz who in real life had a reputation of sacking quarterbacks, sacks the lion quarterback played by NFL MVP Brian Sipe.

References 

Living people
American football linebackers
Los Angeles Rams players
San Francisco 49ers players
Houston Oilers players
Carolina Panthers players
San Diego State Aztecs football players
1965 births
People from Carmichael, California